Tinajas Altas Pass is a gap in the Tinajas Altas Mountains in Yuma County, Arizona.

History 
Tinajas Altas Pass was the route that El Camino del Diablo followed through the Tinajas Altas Mountains.

References 

Geography of Yuma County, Arizona
Mountain passes of Arizona